Ângelo Moreira da Costa Lima (1887–1964) was the foremost Brazilian entomologist of his time, and his still-consulted works continue to assure his place in the history of science as the "Father" of Brazilian entomology.

Life
Costa Lima, as he is called in Brazil, was born on June 29, 1887, in Rio de Janeiro, Brazil, to Valeriano Moreira da Costa Lima and Rosa Delfina Brum de Lima.

Works
  The legacy of Costa Lima rests on his many contributions to Brazilian entomology. His Terceiro Catálogo was for many years the most consulted work on Brazilian plant-insect associations. It has since been replaced by the Quarto Catálogo that was directly based on Costa Lima's earlier work.
  Costa Lima's Insetos do Brasil in eleven volumes is a valuable resource on Brazilian entomology and is regularly consulted even today.
  Honorary Fellow of the Association for Tropical Biology (and Conservation) 1963,

References
 d’Araújo e Silva, A. G., Gonçalves, C. R., Galvão, D. M., et al.. (1967–1968). Quarto catálogo dos insetos que vivem nas plantas do Brasil, seus parasitos e predadores. Rio de Janeiro. 
 Bloch, P. (1968). Vida e obra de Ângelo Moreira da Costa Lima . Rio de Janeiro: Conselho Nacional de Pesquisas. 
 Costa Lima, A. M. (1936). Terceiro catálogo dos insetos que vivem nas plantas do Brasil. Seus parasitos e predadores. Rio de Janeiro: Diretoria de Estatistica da Produção. Ministerio da Agricultura.
 Costa Lima, A. M. (1938–1960). Insetos do Brasil, v. 1-11. Rio de Janeiro: Escola Nacional de Agronomia.

Brazilian entomologists
20th-century Brazilian zoologists
1887 births
1964 deaths